Ryssdal is a Norwegian surname. Notable people with the surname include:

Kai Ryssdal (born 1963), American radio journalist 
Rolv Ryssdal (1914–1998), Norwegian judge
Signe Marie Stray Ryssdal (1924–2019), Norwegian lawyer and politician

Norwegian-language surnames